Thennala G. Balakrishna Pillai (born 11 March 1930) is an Indian politician representing the Indian National Congress and is a former Member of the Parliament representing Kerala in the Rajya Sabha, the upper house of the Indian Parliament. He was the president of Kerala Pradesh Congress Committee. (KPCC) 1998–2001 and 2004–2005.

Early life
He was born at Sooranad, Kingdom of Travancore on 11 March 1930, as the son of N. Gopala Pillai and N. Eswari Amma and brought up there. He got married on 3 July 1963 to Sathi Devi and they had one daughter. He holds a degree in B.Sc. from Mahatma Gandhi College, Thiruvananthapuram.

Political career 
Pillai started his political life from very young age. He was elected as:

 President of Sooranadu, Pulikulam ward Congress committee. President of Mandalam Congress committee of Sooranadu North in Kollam district.
 President of Kunnathur Block Congress Committee.
 President Village Service Society, Sooranadu North
 President Engineering Technicians Co-operative society
 President District Co-operative Bank, Pathanamthitta
 Vice President District Co-operative Bank, Kollam
 Chairman Disciplinary Action Committee constituted by KPCC to recommend action against those who worked against those who contested and worked against the official candidates in the local bodies elections held in the year 1989 and again in 1996.
 Chairman Committee constituted by KPCC to scrutinise the membership of the party in its organisational election.
 Chairman Committee constituted by KPCC to go into allegations against Ministers for their interference in organisational election.
 Chairman Committee constituted by KPCC to enquire into the reasons for the failure of CWC Member Shri. K. Karunakaran in Thrissur Parliament Elections
 Chairman State Campaign Committee Chairman in 1996 Elections
 Convener Congress MPs from Kerala
 KPCC Member since 1962
 Treasurer District Congress Committee, Kollam
 President of the Kollam DCC for 5.5 years
 General Secretary, Kerala Pradesh Congress (I) Committee (K.P.C.C.) (1981–92)
 Chairman Scrutiny Committee of KPCC for the organisational election (1990–1992)
 Chairman, Disciplinary Action Committee of the KPCC (1998–2001)
 President KPCC (1998–2001)
 Member of the Kerala Legislative Assembly from Adoor Constituency (1977–80 and 1982–87)
 July 1991 Elected to the Rajya Sabha
 Member, Rubber Board
 April 1992 Re-elected to Rajya Sabha
 April 2003 Re-elected to Rajya Sabha
 Member, Sree Chitra Tirunal Institute for Medical Sciences and Technology, Thiruvananthapuram
 Member Committee on Urban and Rural Development (April 1993 – April 1998)
 Consultative Committee for the Ministry of Urban and Rural Development
 Member, Joint Committee of the Houses of Parliament committee on salaries and allowance of the members of parliament (1992–1998)
 Member, National River Conservation Authority
 Member, Petition Committee of Rajya Sabha
 Member Managing Committee State Co-operative Union Kerala
 Member, Committee on Commerce
 Member, Consultative Committee for the Ministry of Agriculture and Ministry of Consumer Affairs
 Member, National Shipping Board
 Member, Philatelic Advisory Committee
 Member, Sub Committee for Special Economic Zones.
 President Akhila Kerala Ayyyappa Seva Sangham

References

External links

Indian National Congress politicians from Kerala
Rajya Sabha members from Kerala
Malayali politicians
Living people
1930 births